The colossal statue of Shapur I (Persian: پیکره شاپور یکم) is a statue of Shapur I (AD 240–272), the second shah (king) of the Sassanid Empire. It stands in the Shapur cave, a huge limestone cave located about 6 km from the ancient city of Bishapur in the south of Iran.

About 1400 years ago, after the Arab invasion of Iran and collapse of the Sasanian Empire, the statue was pulled down and a part of one of its legs was broken. About 70 years ago, again, parts of his arms were also broken in an earthquake. The statue had been lying on the ground for about 14 centuries until 1957 when Mohammad Reza Pahlavi, the last Shah of Iran, had a group of Iranian military to raise it again on its feet and repair the broken foot with iron and cement. The project of raising the statue, building the roads from Bishapur to the area and paths in the mountain, stairs and iron fences on the route to the cave took six months in 1957.

The statue is about 35 m from the cave entrance, on the fourth of five terraces, lying approximately 3.4 m below the level of the cave entrance. Its height of about 6.7 m and breadth across the shoulders of more than 2 m make it one of the most impressive sculptures from the Sassanian period.

Characteristic features of the colossal statue 

The monumental sculpture is chiseled from a huge stalagmite grown in situ, but it no longer stands exactly in its original position. After its fall (probably caused by an earthquake), the sculpture was raised onto two concrete pillars, which are located near the original feet. The head and the body of the sculpture have remained quite well preserved while parts of its arms and almost all of both legs are missing.

The colossal statue is rich in detail. It is chiseled on every side with the same amount of extraordinary care and attention. The king wears a crenellated crown. A large piece of the front crenellation is missing, while the crenellations of both sides and the rear are well preserved. At the lower end of the crown, there is a wide diadem. The two bands of the diadem fall heavily down the back to the waist and widen from top to bottom. Around twenty horizontal, parallel furrows cross on these bands. The head of the sculpture has been carved out in all its particulars symmetrically. The hairstyle of the colossal statue shows a high degree of sculptural definition. The mass of hair on the left side of the sculpture has remained intact while the ends of strands of hair on the right side are broken off. Of the left arm of the sculpture, only half remains. The missing left hand of the sculpture must have once rested on the sword handle. The right arm is broken off just below the axilla. A small part of the right underarm is still attached. The right hand is strongly weathered and rests on the waist.

The clothing of the colossal statue consists of three pieces: an undervest, an upper garment and wide trousers. The upper garment of the sculpture fits tightly to the body and appears to be made of a sheer fabric. Through its skin-tight fit, the shoulders, the upper arms and the chest of the king have been emphasized. The sculpted ornaments on the upper garment are quite remarkable insofar as they resemble flames flickering downward. These are varyingly long, shaped in several different ways and irregularly arranged. At the waist, the upper garment is held together tightly by a belt while a second belt, which is hanging loosely around the hips, functions to fasten on the sword scabbard.

Only small parts of the legs of the sculpture have remained. The small remaining piece of the left thigh supports a conclusion that the ruler was wearing fluted trousers. The fact that the trousers of Shapur I originally reached the ground is evident from the traces of folds encircling the original feet of the sculpture at irregular intervals. It stands to reason that the sculptor designed the length of the trousers not only for aesthetical reasons but also to increase the sculpture's stability. The long trousers would have functioned to enlarge contact area with the ground and to spread the stress of the colossal statue, which weighs several tonnes.
 
The two feet of the sculpture are slightly spread. The left foot is lying a little ahead of the right foot. The original shoes of the colossal statue now have a contrasting conservation status. The right shoe is largely destroyed. The left shoe is virtually intact and has a round toe cap. The broad shoelaces, pleated lengthways, meander in an S-shape onto the ground.

On the colossal statue of Shapur I, there are three pieces of jewellery: a necklace, earrings made of large pearls and an armlet on the right wrist.

Identification of the statue 
In the Sassanian period, the crowns' details were subject to stringent regulations and varied from one king to another. Each Sassanian king possessed his own crown, designed at the time of his accession to power.
Because of the shape of the crown (diadem, the crenellated part and korymbos) and on the basis of art historical considerations, the colossal statue can be clearly identified as Shapur I, the second Sassanian king.

Reconstruction of the crown 
Shapur I is not always shown wearing a crenellated crown, but he is never represented with a crenellated crown without a korymbos. A korymbos, or globular-shaped structure, sat originally on the top of the crown of the sculpture standing in the cave. The presence of a borehole on the vertex indicates that the korymbos could not have been of stone, but consisted of metal. The korymbos of the colossal statue was originally 1.5 m high and 1 m wide. After research and experimentation at the University of Basel, it was found that a korymbos of metal of a suitable size would have weighed more than a tonne even with a very low wall thickness.

Hairstyle as an important criterion for dating the statue 
Below the diadem, the hair springs thickly up. There are four rows of strands that are very clearly distinguishable from each other and lying in waves on top of each other, on both sides of the face. The wave patterns of the individual strands are almost identical, but at their tips, the heavily stylized, nearly spherical curls differ. The end of the top strand is rolled up on each side of the head like a snail. The underlying strands have differing forms of braided knots at their ends. The wavy strands billow out on each side across the shoulders with the curl of the lowest and shortest strand lying on the shoulder.

This kind of hairstyle can be only seen on those rock reliefs of Shapur I that were carved after 260 AD and is, therefore, the most important criterion for the precise dating of the colossal statue of Shapur I. Due to the details of the hairstyle, G. Reza Garosi succeeded to date the colossal statue exactly in the second half of the sixties of third century AD.

Sculptor 
The anonymous sculptor of the colossal statue of Shapur I must be considered one of the greatest sculptors in the ancient Near East. It is certain that he succeeded in finishing the colossal statue. According to post-Sassanian reports, the sculpture, which weighed several tonnes, stood on its own feet at least until the 14th century AD. An adept sculptor was not the only master for creating this sculpture – a skilled metalsmith was also involved in this work. The metalsmith was responsible for making the korymbos of metal and had to fix it firmly onto the crown of the colossal statue. The addition of a metal korymbos was indeed an innovation and is not known from any other statue in the ancient Near East. In the Sassanian era, no other statues with similar dimensions have been discovered. Thus, the colossal statue of Shapur I must be considered as an absolute exception in the history of Sassanian sculptural art.

State of research 
Although the colossal statue of Shapur I is known in Europe since at least 1811, it was not dealt detailed till recently. It was mentioned, for example, by Roman Ghirshman, Kurt Erdmann and Georgina Herrmann. The first comprehensive research about the cave and the colossal statue of Shapur I was done by G. Reza Garosi.

Gallery

See also
 List of colossal sculptures in situ

Literature 
 James Justinian Morier. A journey through Persia, Armenia, and Asia Minor, to Constantinople, in the years 1808 and 1809. 1812 
 A journey from India to England, through Persia, Georgia, Russia, Poland, and Prussia, in the year 1817. By Lieut. Col. John Johnson. 1818
 Roman Ghirshman: Iran, Parther und Sasaniden. Universum der Kunst. Hrsg. André Malraux; Georges Salles (1962).
 Kurt Erdmann: Die Kunst Irans zur Zeit der Sasaniden. 2. Aufl.; Kupferberg (1969).
 Georgina Herrmann: The Iranian revival. Impressum Oxford: Elsevier-Phaidon (1977).
 G. Reza Garosi: Die Kolossal-Statue Šāpūrs I. im Kontext der sasanidischen Plastik. Publishing company: Philipp von Zabern, Mainz & Darmstadt, Germany (2009).
 G. Reza Garosi: The Colossal Statue of Shapur I in the Context of Sasanian Sculptures. Publisher: Persian Heritage Foundation, New York (2012).

References

Shapur I
Sasanian art
Statues in Iran
Colossal statues
Sculpture of the Ancient Near East
Buildings and structures in Fars Province